Daniel Mella (born Montevideo, 1976) is a Uruguayan writer. 

He published his first novel Pogo in 1997 at the age of 21, followed by two more novels in quick succession. He then took a decade-long break from writing, returning with the short story collection Lava which won the Bartolomé Hidalgo Award in 2013. His next book, the novel El Hermano Mayor was based on the death of his younger brother Alejandro in 2014. This too won the Bartolomé Hidalgo Award and has been translated into English by Charco Press.

Works
1997, Pongo
1998, Derretimiento 
2000, Noviembre 
2013, Lava 
2016, El hermano mayor 
2020, Visiones para Emma
2020, Inés/María

References

1976 births
Living people
Uruguayan male writers
Uruguayan novelists
Uruguayan male short story writers
Premio Bartolomé Hidalgo